Hillar Hein (born 19 January 1954) is an Estonian ski jumper, Nordic combined skier and coach.

He was born in Tallinn. In 1998 he graduated from Tallinn Pedagogical Institute's Faculty of Physical Education.

He started his ski jumping exercising in 1964, coached by Uno Kajak, Enn Uhkai and Raimond Mürk. He is multiple-times Estonian champion in ski jumping and Nordic combined skiing.

Since 1984 he is working as a coach. Students: Jens Salumäe, Jaan Jüris, Kaarel Nurmsalu, Artti Aigro.

References

Living people
1954 births
Estonian male ski jumpers
Estonian male Nordic combined skiers
Estonian sports coaches
Tallinn University alumni
Sportspeople from Tallinn